Michałówka  is a village in Poland located in Lesser Poland Voivodeship, in Olkusz County, in Gmina Trzyciąż. It had a population of 500 in 2005.

References

Villages in Olkusz County